Umeki (written: 梅木) is a Japanese surname. Notable people with the surname include:

, Japanese judoka
, Japanese-American singer and actress

Japanese-language surnames